Gregory Jasper Cruttwell (born 22 March 1960) is an English filmmaker, football consultant and former actor. He is the son of actress Geraldine McEwan and Hugh Cruttwell, former principal of the Royal Academy of Dramatic Art.

Biography
Cruttwell attended the London Academy of Music and Dramatic Art. Before branching out as a writer, director and producer, Cruttwell performed in over 20 theatre productions throughout Great Britain. In 1990, he wrote and starred in the play Waiting for Sir Larry, which won a Fringe First Award at the Edinburgh Festival.
 
He made his film debut in Mike Leigh's  Naked (1993) and had a leading role in John Herzfeld's 2 Days in the Valley (1996), starring alongside Danny Aiello, James Spader and Jeff Daniels. His last acting role to date was in the box office success George of the Jungle (1997).
 
Cruttwell has been seen in numerous British television productions, Murder Most Horrid, French & Saunders, and Birds of a Feather. In the United States, he guest starred in episodes of Murder, She Wrote and The Marshal.
 
In 2000 he wrote and directed the feature film, Chunky Monkey, starring David Threlfall and Alison Steadman, which had a limited release in the UK.

In 2002 he co-founded production company Head Gear Films with Phil Hunt and Compton Ross and in 2007 co-founded international sales and film finance company Bankside Films. 
 
In 2001, Cruttwell founded Balham Blazers Football Club. In 2011, the club was voted South East England Charter Standard Community Club of the Year, becoming a full-time senior outfit in Balham F.C. in the process, and in 2012 Cruttwell won the London FA Award for Outstanding Contribution To Football In The Community. 
 
Since its formation the club has won over 450 league and cup trophies. It is also a three-time winner of the London F.A. Charter Standard Community Club of the Year Award and a four-time winner of the Wandsworth Sports Club of the Year Award.
 
In addition to founding the club Cruttwell is also Chairman, Director of Football and First Team Manager.
In 2018 the club, nicknamed The Blazers, having won five promotions in six years, made its first appearance in the FA Cup and won the London Senior Cup, having won the London Senior Trophy in 2017.
 
In 2018 Cruttwell co-devised football based TV Quiz show, Football Genius, a Hat Trick production, which was shown on ITV, with Tim Vine as host and Sam Quek and Paul Sinha as team captains.
 
In 2019 he founded production company, Park the Bus, with a remit to make sports related drama and documentaries.
 
Cruttwell, who lives in Suffolk and South London, has four children, one grandchild and is a lifelong Fulham FC supporter.

References

External links

Park the Bus Ltd

1960 births
Living people
Alumni of the London Academy of Music and Dramatic Art
English male film actors
English male television actors
English film directors
English film producers
English screenwriters
English football managers
English male screenwriters
Male actors from London